The Friends of Eddie Coyle is a 1973  American neo-noir crime film starring Robert Mitchum and Peter Boyle and directed by Peter Yates. The screenplay by Paul Monash was adapted from the 1970 novel The Friends of Eddie Coyle by George V. Higgins.

The film tells the story of Eddie Coyle (Mitchum), a small-time career hoodlum in the Irish Mob in Boston, Massachusetts.  The title is purely ironic: Eddie has no friends.

While critical reception was positive, with particular praise for Mitchum's performance, the movie was not popular with filmgoers and failed to rank in the top 30 either in 1973 (when it was released mid-year) or 1974, and failed to recoup its budget in combined box office.

Plot
Eddie Coyle is a low-level gunrunner based out of Quincy, Massachusetts. He supplies pistols to a bank robbery crew led by Jimmy Scalise and Artie Van, first obtaining the guns from a fellow gunrunner named Jackie Brown. At the same time, Coyle is facing several years of jailtime for a truck hijacking in New Hampshire set up by Dillon, who owns a local bar that Coyle frequents. Coyle cooperates with ATF agent Dave Foley in order to get his sentencing cleared, but is unaware that Dillon is an informant for Foley; Dillon meets with Foley in person every week to receive $20 from him.

The crew kidnap Mr. Partridge, the manager of the South Shore National Bank, in order to rob the bank. They are successful and make a clean getaway. Afterward, Coyle meets with Foley to discuss his sentencing. Coyle tells him that he knows a gunrunner, Jackie, that he could potentially have Foley arrest in order to ease the sentencing; Foley sits on this idea. Meanwhile, Jackie meets a hippie couple in Cambridge who wish to purchase M16 rifles off of him. He reluctantly agrees to sell them in a discreet location at a specific time. Jackie then meets with Coyle who requires him to acquire guns for the next day. While unsure at first that he can complete the task, Jackie complies and heads to Rhode Island later that night with an associate to get the guns, which he is successful in doing.

The crew rob a second bank, this time in South Weymouth. Towards the end of the robbery, one of the tellers triggers a silent alarm and is shot dead by one of the robbers, requiring a hasty exit by the crew. They are able to flee without any police following them but become wanted for murder as a result. Afterward, Jackie meets Coyle in the parking lot of a Dedham grocery store to deliver him the guns. Once the exchange is finished, Coyle calls Foley from a payphone to tip him off about Jackie's exchange with the hippie couple at the Sharon train station. There, Foley and a group of agents watch the area from afar with sniper rifles. The couple arrive and Jackie tells them to meet him elsewhere at a later time, as he believes that he is being watched. Once they leave, Foley and his team move in to make the arrest. Jackie recognizes the agents' cars and attempts to flee but is boxed in at the exit and put in handcuffs, immediately realizing that Coyle had set him up.

Coyle and Foley have another meeting, at which Foley says that Jackie's arrest was not enough to clear Coyle's sentence. In preparation for the third robbery, the crew move in to kidnap the bank's manager but are ambushed by Foley and other ATF agents and placed under arrest. The next day, Coyle decides to tip Foley off about Scalise and his crew but is unaware of their arrest. Foley shows him the arrest in the newspaper and departs, leaving Coyle anguished. Soon after, Dillon is told that a mob boss wants him to assassinate Coyle. Dillon invites Coyle out to a Boston Bruins game at the Boston Garden along with a hood whom Dillon claims is his "wife's nephew". At the game, Coyle becomes severely drunk and eventually passes out in the car ride afterward. The hood drives them to a discreet location, where Dillon shoots Coyle in the head. They swap out cars in the parking lot of a bowling alley and leave.

Dillon and Foley meet outside Boston City Hall the next day, where Foley thanks Dillon for giving him Scalise and his crew. Foley is largely unconcerned that Dillon cannot tell him who murdered Coyle, leaving the impression that he knows Dillon is involved but likely would not have pursued the killing of Coyle himself. After they finish conversing, they walk away in separate directions.

Cast
 Robert Mitchum as Eddie Coyle
 Peter Boyle as Dillon
 Richard Jordan as Dave Foley
 Steven Keats as Jackie Brown
 Alex Rocco as Jimmy Scalise
 Joe Santos as Artie Van
 Mitchell Ryan as Waters
 Helena Carroll as Sheila Coyle
 Jack Kehoe as The Beard
 Margaret Ladd as Andrea
 James Tolkan as The Man's Contact Man
 Peter MacLean as Partridge

Production
Filming took place throughout the Boston area, including Government Center in Boston, and Dedham, Cambridge, Milton, Quincy, Sharon, Somerville, Malden, and Weymouth, Massachusetts.

During the making of the film, Mitchum was interested in meeting the local gangsters as part of his research. Journalist George Kimball, a sports writer on the Boston Herald at the time, claimed that Mitchum wanted to meet Whitey Bulger and was warned against it by Higgins. What is claimed instead is that cast member Alex Rocco, who grew up in Somerville, introduced Mitchum to Howie Winter of the Winter Hill Gang.

Reception
The Friends of Eddie Coyle was not well received by the filmgoing public.  It failed to place in the top 30 in film revenue in 1973 (when it was released mid-year) or 1974, and failed to recoup its estimated $3 million budget in combined box office returns.  It was, however, well-reviewed by some critics, and today is among the most highly regarded crime films of the 1970s by some. Upon its release, Roger Ebert of the Chicago Sun-Times gave it four stars, his highest rating, while Vincent Canby of The New York Times also reviewed it favorably, calling it "a good, tough, unsentimental movie". Both reviewers singled out Mitchum's lead performance as a key ingredient of the film's success. Ebert wrote: "Eddie Coyle is made for him [Mitchum]: a weary middle-aged man, but tough and proud; a man who has been hurt too often in life not to respect pain; a man who will take chances to protect his own territory."

On Rotten Tomatoes, the film holds a rating of 98% from 40 reviews.

Home media
The Criterion Collection released a special edition DVD of the film on May 19, 2009. It included a director's commentary by Peter Yates, who died less than two years after the DVD came out. Criterion released a Blu-ray version on April 28, 2015.

See also
 List of American films of 1973

References

External links

 
 
 
The Friends of Eddie Coyle: They Were Expendable an essay by Kent Jones at the Criterion Collection

1973 films
1973 crime films
American crime films
1970s English-language films
Films scored by Dave Grusin
Films based on American novels
Films about the Irish Mob
Films directed by Peter Yates
Films set in Boston
American neo-noir films
Films shot in Dedham, Massachusetts
1970s American films